Tara Prasad (born 24 February 2000) is an Indian-American figure skater who represents India in women's singles skating. She is a two-time Indian national champion and competed in the final segment of the 2022 Four Continents Figure Skating Championships.

Personal life 
Prasad was born on 24 February 2000 in Cedar Rapids, Iowa, to Indian immigrants from Tamil Nadu. Her mother, Kavita Ramaswamy, was a national champion in hurdling for India in her teens. Except for her father, who lives with her in the United States, Prasad's family lives in Chennai, India. Prasad splits her time between the two countries and holds Indian citizenship since 2019.

Prasad's figure skating inspirations include 2010 Olympic champion Kim Yu-na, 2015 World champion Elizaveta Tuktamysheva, and fellow Indian-American skater Ami Parekh.

Career 
Prasad began learning how to skate at age seven in Cedar Rapids. She competed domestically for the United States as a child at the juvenile through the novice levels until 2015. She made her international debut for India in 2020 at the Mentor Toruń Cup.

2021–2022 season 

She competed at her first major competition at Four Continents in 2022.

Programs

Competitive highlights

References

External links

Tracings.net profile

2000 births
Living people
Sportspeople from Cedar Rapids, Iowa
Figure skaters from Colorado Springs, Colorado
Sportspeople from Chennai
Indian female single skaters
American female single skaters
American people of Indian Tamil descent
American sportspeople of Indian descent
Former United States citizens
People with acquired Indian citizenship